Yvonne Chapman (born October 7, 1988) is a Canadian actress and model, known for her role as villain Zhilan Zhang in The CW's Kung Fu (2021–present).

Early life
Chapman was born and raised in Calgary to Chinese-Canadian parents. She attended high school at Bishop McNally High School and St. Mary's High School, and completed her Bachelor of Commerce at the University of Calgary. She worked as a corporate development analyst before taking a leave of absence to pursue acting in Vancouver.

Career
Chapman began acting in school plays at age 10, and began modelling in her late teens, working between Calgary and Hong Kong. In 2019, Chapman starred in the reboot of CBC's Street Legal (2019). The series was not continued for a second season.

In November 2020, Chapman was cast in a recurring role for Kung Fu (2021–present), a reboot of the 1972 series of the same name. She was upgraded to series regular status for the second season. In December 2021, Chapman was cast in Netflix's live-action adaptation of Avatar: The Last Airbender, playing the recurring role of Avatar Kyoshi.

Filmography

Television

References

External links
Yvonne Chapman at the Internet Movie Database

Canadian television actresses
Canadian actresses of Chinese descent
Canadian female models
University of Calgary alumni
Living people
1988 births